"Brennende Liebe" (German for Burning Desire) is the second single from German industrial metal group Oomph! from Wahrheit oder Pflicht (second edition). At first, the single had been released as a B-side single like Niemand had been, but later the song appeared on the re-edition of Wahrheit oder Pflicht. The song features Sonja Kraushofer from L'Âme Immortelle doing about half the lines.

Music video
The music video is based upon Bride of Frankenstein. Dero is a mad scientist and Crap and Flux are his "medical" assistants, bringing monsters to life. They have already created a monster like Frankenstein's, and now they are working on a female, presumably to become Dero's bride instead of the male monster´s. In the video, the male monster works as an assistant, but when the monster picks the chosen brain for the female he accidentally dropped the brain, so he takes a different one; Dero gets suspicious but he and the rest of the band continue working.  To Dero's disappointment, when the female monster is brought to life and sees Dero she screams in horror and faints into the male monster's arms; when she see him she falls in love with the male monster who was feeling the same way even before she came to life, and commands him to kill their creators (the full band). The monster chokes Dero (and maybe Flux and Crap) to death and takes his brain and those of the other band members in three beakers full of embalming fluid and the two monsters leave the lab.

Track listing

Standard 
 Brennende Liebe (feat. L'Âme Immortelle)
 Brennende Liebe (Transporterraum Mix)
 Brennende Liebe (Hot Love Mix)

Limited edition 
 Brennende Liebe (feat. L'Âme Immortelle)
 Eiszeit (Ideal cover)
 Kill Me Again
 Brennende Liebe (Transporterraum Mix)
 Brennende Liebe (Hot Love Mix)
 Brennende Liebe (videotrack)

Charts

Weekly charts

Year-end charts

References

Oomph! songs
2004 singles
2004 songs
Songs written by Dero Goi